Ratières is a commune in the Drôme department in southeastern France.

Population

Sights

 The Tour de Ratières is the 14th keep of a castle. Extensive modern gardens designed by Paolo Tonini are in the grounds.

See also
Communes of the Drôme department

References

Communes of Drôme